Jamie "Fletch" Fletcher is a fictional character from the British Channel 4 soap opera Hollyoaks, played by Sam Darbyshire. The character debuted on-screen during episodes airing in October 2005. Fletch was created by executive producer David Hanson as a recurring character. In 2007 new executive producer Bryan Kirkwood promoted Darbyshire to the regular cast. Fletch made his final on-screen appearance on 21 August 2008. Fletch's main storyline was an addiction to the drug heroin.

Casting
In 2007 Darbyshire was promoted to the regular cast by executive producer Bryan Kirkwood as his screen time increased as part of central storylines.

Character development
In 2008 Fletch was involved in a storyline in which he and Sasha Valentine (Nathalie Emmanuel) become addicted to heroin. Emmanuel said in an interview that she would like Fletch to return but was unsure how because when he left "he had no one" and "he even mugged Sasha".

Storylines
Jamie is best friends with his cousin Josh Ashworth (Sonny Flood). He attended Hollyoaks Comprehensive School. He spent a lot of time attempting to devise money-making schemes. After classmate Amy Barnes (Ashley Slanina-Davies) had a fallout with her friend Michaela McQueen (Hollie-Jay Bowes), Fletch stood up for her against Michaela and Amy's ex-boyfriend Ste Hay (Kieron Richardson), suggesting that he had a crush on Amy. He persuades the Ashworth family to buy Drive 'N' Buy. He was then involved in a car accident involving Josh, Michaela, Amy and Ste and was convicted for joyriding. Fletch wrote a song Hannah Ashworth's (Emma Rigby) 18th birthday party. Fletch forms a band with Michaela, Josh, Amy and Sasha Valentine (Nathalie Emmanuel). Sasha and Michaela started to war over Fletch.

Fletch's first drug use was when he attended a wild party at Ste and Amy's council flat where he was pressured into smoking cannabis by Ste. As a result, Fletch started smoking cannabis on a regular basis as he enjoyed it. Sasha soon got fed up with Fletch's newfound hobby, so she told him not to hang around with her anymore. A depressed Sasha tried to find Fletch after overhearing Valerie Holden (Samantha Giles) and Leo Valentine (Brian Bovell) describe her as boring and with her confidence gone down, Sasha decided to join in with Fletch's hobby and they both started smoking cannabis together. At a party, Fletch suggested to Sasha that they take some Speed. It took some convincing but he managed to talk her into it and they sneak off to take it. Within minutes after taking it, their moods changed from being bored, to wide awake, excited and chatty. They both suffer the effects the next morning with a drug-induced hangover.

Fletch picked up heroin that dropped out of Michaela's mother, Myra McQueen's (Nicole Barber-Lane), bag in Drive 'n' Buy, and kept it in his school locker. Fletch was terrified when Mrs Webster did a spot check of lockers looking for drugs. Fletch pleaded with Sasha to help him but she couldn't understand why he even picked up heroin in the first place and ignored him. Just as the locker search was about to begin, Sasha set off the fire alarm and saved Fletch from getting caught with drugs. Fletch thanked Sasha but she demanded he got rid of the heroin. Later Sasha discovered heroin in Fletch's pocket again and was horrified that he had kept it. She lambastes Fletch, but her curiosity got the better of her and they both agreed to try the heroin just once. They started sleeping together and taking it more often.

It soon became an addiction, and both were even willing to steal to buy more heroin for themselves. Fletch went to visit Ste to buy more heroin, and took it in Ste and Amy's flat. Amy was furious when she unexpectedly returned to the flat and found Fletch almost unconscious while Leah was there. Ste denied selling Fletch the drugs, but Amy wasn't interested and left. Later that day, Sasha came across Fletch staggering across the village. Fletch was completely wasted and dumped her. The next day, Fletch went to visit Sasha in hospital after she let Ste inject her with heroin, and apologized to her saying he didn't mean it when he said he didn't want to be with her anymore, but an angry Leo threw him out, warning him to stay away from Sasha as he thought Fletch was the one who Sasha was doing drugs with. Later that day, Fletch went to visit Ste to buy more heroin, but Ste refused and said he didn't want to sell anymore drugs after what happened to Sasha, leaving a desperate Fletch wanting more heroin.

After Sasha recovered from her hangover, she met up with Fletch and asked him if he had got anymore drugs, but he didn't and said it would be best if they both laid off the drugs for a while. Danny Valentine (David Judge) found Fletch with Sasha and told him it would be best if he and Sasha wouldn't see each other any more, which Fletch agreed to but Sasha still wanted to be with him. Fletch spotted Sasha and Justin Burton (Chris Fountain) kissing together in the village, so Fletch confronted her and told her he saw them both kissing. Sasha reminded Fletch that he dumped her, telling him he had no right to be jealous, but then Fletch admitted he wanted her back with him and with little hesitation, they return to form and score some drugs. Sasha and Fletch bought more heroin by stealing Nancy Dean's (Jessica Fox) purse in Il Gnosh and stole the money she had in it. Later, Michaela saw a wasted Sasha and Fletch at the park and pitied them. On Fletch's 17th birthday, Hannah bumped into him in the village and invited him round for a birthday lunch. Fletch agreed but Josh was adamant that he wouldn't show up as usual. When Fletch finally showed up at the Ashworths, his party was overshadowed by the return of Rhys Ashworth (Andrew Moss) and he sneaked out, feeling ignored. Fletch was desperate for another fix and told Sasha this, so she decided to steal her dad's keys to the boiler room and sent a text message to Fletch telling him to meet her there so they could take the drugs there to avoid the risk of getting caught in the village. Sasha and Fletch were again desperate for another fix but neither had any money, so Sasha decided to con money out of her dad who was blinded by her desperation to score and returned to her hideout with Fletch to take more heroin.

Just before sixth form exams were about to start, Fletch asked Sasha if she wanted to take heroin with him that he borrowed from Nige, and said he could pay Nige back tomorrow, but Sasha suggested they should take it after the exams. Unable to resist, Fletch took the heroin in the bathroom on his own, and arrived late for his exam totally off his head, and vomited on his desk half way through examination, thus failing and is sent home. Later that day, Fletch attempted to steal money from Drive 'n' Buy to pay back Nige, but at the last minute is spotted by Josh and threatened Fletch he'd call the police, but Fletch ignored him and tried to run away with the money, only for Josh to grab him down and take the money away from him. The next day, Sasha told Fletch that Nige confronted her telling her he knows she's with Fletch scoring drugs and wanted his money back. Fletch promised to get the money and turned to Josh in Drive 'n' Buy but he was sick of being used and refused to help. As Fletch left the shop he spotted an opportunity to snatch a bag in the village, he quickly shoved Myra McQueen and grabbed her bag, but she was unaware of who it was. Frustrated to find no money inside, Fletch and Sasha stole a laptop from the head teacher's office to try and sell it to buy more heroin.

Nige reveals Sasha had been sleeping with him for drugs, so he dumps her. After Fletch's parents caught him stealing in an attempt to buy more drugs, they disowned him. Fletch's desperation forced him to go back to Nige, and agreed to sell dope to kids in school in order to get his fix from Nige. Later Fletch finds himself homeless and hungry as he begged in the park. The next day, Josh went to find where Fletch had been sleeping rough after he heard his family had disowned him but was disgusted to find that he was high on heroin.

Fletch was grateful to be taken into the Ashworths' but he couldn't bear how he was feeling and begged Josh for money to buy more drugs but Josh refused. Fletch's desperation got the better of him, so he stole Josh's laptop in order to sell it to buy more heroin. When Fletch arrived back at the Ashworths', he went up to Josh's room and injected himself with heroin. Josh, Neville Ashworth (Jim Millea) and Suzanne Ashworth (Suzanne Hall) were horrified when they found Fletch lying on the floor unconscious. They lock him up to try to get it out of his system. Fletch implored Hannah to help him and begged her to let him out of the room, but Hannah said it was for his own good and would only be in there for a few days. In an attempt to support him, Hannah told Fletch of her experiences when she was sectioned with anorexia. Fletch then started crying as he could not bear being locked up in the room, and Hannah felt sorry for him, so she unlocked the door to let him out and embraced him. Fletch panicked when he saw Josh coming up the stairs. Josh tried to bundle him back in, but Fletch overpowered him and accidentally caught Hannah in the face and knocked her down, and then escaped from the Ashworths'.

With nowhere else to go, Fletch was using school as his only refuge. Fletch decided to leave school. Fletch forgave Sasha for having sex with Nige, and begged her to leave Hollyoaks to come to London with him, but Sasha, however, could not decide. Niall Rafferty (Barry Sloane) pushed a pregnant Tina Reilly (Leah Hackett) down the city stairs, Fletch was the only one to witness this action, however Niall blamed him for the attack. No one believed Fletch's claims that he was innocent, and he escaped Carmel McQueen (Gemma Merna) who was trying to arrest him. Fletch went to the hospital to try and explain what had happened, but Niall made things clear that no one would believe him, so he left. A month or two later, Fletch showed up for results day at Sixth Form where he convinced a now clean Sasha that he was also clean. He asked Sasha to move away with him, however, Sasha spotted marks on Fletch's arm from a recent heroin injection. Upon Sasha's discovery Fletch resorted to mugging Sasha and running away. That was his last appearance.

Reception
Soap opera magazine Inside Soap have opined they are not fans of the Fletch and Josh duo, of this they stated: "The 'comedy duo' thing is wearing thin - the writers should ditch them and give more screen time to Justin and Becca!"

References

External links
 Character profile at E4.com
 Character profile at Hollyoaks.com

Hollyoaks characters
Television characters introduced in 2005
Ashworth family
Fictional heroin users
Male characters in television